APP6 may refer to:

Allied Procedural Publication 6 (APP-6), NATO Joint Military Symbology
The Apprentice (British series 6), series six of British reality television series The Apprentice